The term Beilager (in older writings Beylager) was used regionally, and Bettleite and Bettsetzung are preserved. In a narrower sense, however, all refer to the ceremonial part of the marriage, since the High Middle Ages to about the 19th century mostly witnessed in Germany. But the Beilager is also another term for the feast that we call marriage today. To the nuptials included as fixed by the previous courtship ritual nuptials, the wedding night with a dowry for the bride, the Church's blessing (later marriage), and the repatriation of the bride.

When ritual nuptials bride and groom were successively introduced into a festive, ties and double bed. Regional differences, they were to each other put or sit to bed. In any case, the pair was covered with a joint cover. The process had legal force and therefore need witnesses who should bear witness to the legal consummation of marriage later. The oldest surviving Saxon law (Saxony Mirror in 1220) it says: Er ist ihr Vormund und sie ist seine Genossin, und tritt in sein recht, wann si in sein Bett tritt (He is her guardian and she is his companion, and enters his right, when shi occurs to bed). A senior witness or relative (sometimes also a lawyer) inquired the consent of the couple. The whole rite belonged to Muntehe, the guardianship of the woman went from father to husband over.

A royal nuptials was designed with appropriate pomp. The (pre-) marital intercourse copula carnalis. (Medieval Latin sinful connection, it was said in church records) was probably in the early Middle Ages Beilagers part of the ritual. Descriptions of the 15th century, but leave the bride and groom get dressed in the symbolic marriage bed, the carnal union of the pair followed without witnesses on the wedding night. Some authors believe that in the 14th century took place under witness of sexual intercourse.

At a special form of ritual Beilager, called keusches Beilager (chaste nuptials), in which a deputy or messenger of the groom carried out the ritual nuptials, they put a naked sword symbolically as a symbol of physical separation between the bride and matchmakers on the bed. The Abgesandtenwerbung survived to our time in the form of the so-called Handschuhehe (marriage glove) on, which is not recognized legally in Germany.

History
The ritual beilager is in the high Middle Ages rarely witnessed since hardly any wedding descriptions have survived. It is presumed that it was so commonplace that it was not necessary to describe it. In the 14th and 15th century have survived frequent reports of (usually royal) beilager.

The religious influence on the ritual beilager was limited, usually the church blessing was sought only after the wedding night. But there were variations: the royal nuptials Duke Johann Casimir (Saxe-Coburg) with Margaret of Brunswick-Lüneburg in 1599 in Coburg held the general superintendent Melchior Bischoff on ritual nuptials bed a short sermon titled: Christliche Ermahnung geschehen vor der Copulation am 16. Septembris (Christian exhortation happen before copulation on 16 Septembris). But the marriage blessing, he issued until the following day after the wedding night.

In Baltic Sea area is regionally until the 19th century demonstrated the public Bettleite, the rites similar to those of late medieval symbolic Beilager. For Catholic Christians, the church wedding was not until the Council of Trent (1545 - 1563, Session VII) is compulsory. Validity of the church got married very late. The Reformation brought no direct influence on the evaluation of public Bettleite and Beilager a legal action with them.

See also
 Jörg Wettlaufer: Beilager und Bettleite im Ostseeraum (13. bis 19. Jahrhundert). Eine vergleichende Studie zum Wandel von Recht und Brauchtum der Eheschließung, Diss. Kiel,1999 
 Irene Erfen, Karl-Heinz Spiess: Unterwegs zu einem fremden Ehemann; Brautfahrt und Ehe in europäischen Fürstenhäusern in: Fremdheit, Francia, Forschungen zur westeuropäischen Geschichte, Stuttgart, 1997

References

Marriage